The International Six Metre class is a class of classic racing yachts. Sixes are a construction class, meaning that the boats are not identical but are all designed to meet specific measurement formula, in this case International rule. At their heyday, Sixes were the most important international yacht racing class, and they are still raced around the world. "Six metre" in class name does not, somewhat confusingly, refer to length of the boat, but product of the formula; 6mR boats are, on average, 10–11 metres long.

History 

The International rule was set up in 1907 to replace numerous handicap systems which were often local, or at best national, and often also fairly simple, producing extreme boats which were fast but lightly constructed and impractical. The Six Metre class was not the smallest rating established under the rule, but was nonetheless the most popular, and they were chosen as an Olympic class in 1908. However, it was not until revision of the Rule in 1920 when the Sixes really became a popular international racing class. The 1920s and '30s were 'golden age' of the International Rule boats and Sixes were still the most popular class, attracting top sailors and designers to compete for prestigious trophies such as Scandinavian Gold Cup and Olympic medals.

Alexander Robertson & Sons produced a total of five Six Metre yachts between 1921 and 1953. In 1937 their young naval architect David Boyd designed the sleek Six Metre racing yacht Circe, which was described by many as the most successful racing yacht produced at the yard. Mr J. Herbert Thom, one of the Clyde's best helmsmen sailed the yacht with tremendous success in America in 1938 and brought back the Seawanhaka Cup, which was successfully defended in home waters the following year. In later years Circe represented Russia in the 1952 Summer Olympics.

However, Six Metres were criticized as having become too expensive and towards the end of the 1930s they became more so, making the class too exclusive. By 1929, the 5 Metre class was becoming more popular as a cheaper and smaller alternative for Sixes, but the final blow was creation of the International 5.5 Metre class in 1949. The 5.5 Metres soon replaced the Six Metres as the premier international racing class, and after the 1952 Helsinki Olympics Sixes were dropped from Olympic regattas. The Gold Cup was also transferred to the 5.5 m class from 1953 onwards.

Despite this, the class continued to exist, and new boats were made utilising the newest contemporary technologies, although sparingly. During the 1980s, many old sailboat classes experienced revival of interest and Sixes were at the forefront of this development. The Class has undergone a renaissance which has continued to this day, with many old yachts restored or rebuilt to racing condition. Six Metre competition is thriving once again with active fleets in Europe, North America and Scandinavia. Performance differences between classic and modern era Sixes are usually small and they can be raced together.

In 2019 the International Six Metre Association launched an online archive website, allowing researchers around the world to access historical information about the class.

Events

Olympics

World Cup

Scandinavian Gold Cup

References

External links 
 ISMA International Six Metre Association new website of the ISMA International Six Metre Association
International Six Metre Archive
 International Six Metre Association
 Metre Boat Index
 Book: The Six Metre - 100 Years of Racing, published on the centenary of the International Rule
 Sailing Anarchy: Sailboat tour of a 6 meter "Sprig" (video)

6 Metre
Keelboats
Olympic sailing classes
6 Metre (keelboat)
Development sailing classes